This is a list of the Honduras national football team results from 2000 to 2009.

2000

2001
In 2001 Honduras participated in its first Copa América by being a late invitee, replacing Argentina.  Argentina withdrew from the competition after receiving death threats from Colombia, hosts of the tournament.  With a limited squad, Honduras managed to finish third in the competition, eliminating Brazil in the quarterfinals.  Sadly, 2001 also marks unfortunate events for the Honduran side; for the first time in their history Honduras failed to qualify to the CONCACAF Gold Cup by not advancing to the final stage in the 2009 UNCAF Nations Cup.  They were also left on the verge of making it to their second FIFA World Cup by failing to beat Trinidad and Tobago at home in qualifiers, despite hitting the goal post 11 times and Trinidad and Tobago scoring in their only shot on goal.

Other achievements worth mentioning in 2001, it was the first time Honduras beat the United States in their home turf in a World Cup qualifier.

2002

2003

2004

2005

2006

2007

2008

2009

Record
Record does not include matches against clubs or representative teams of association football leagues.

References

2000s